Ryo Matsumura (松村 亮, born 15 June 1994) is a Japanese professional footballer who plays as a attacking midfielder for Indonesian club Persis Solo, on loan from BG Pathum United.

Club statistics
Updated to 23 February 2018.

Honours

Club
BG Pathum United
 Thailand Champions Cup (1): 2021

References

External links

Profile at Vissel Kobe
Profile at Tokushima Vortis

1994 births
Living people
Association football people from Kyoto Prefecture
Japanese footballers
J1 League players
J2 League players
J3 League players
Ryo Matsumura
Ryo Matsumura
Liga 1 (Indonesia) players
Vissel Kobe players
Tochigi SC players
J.League U-22 Selection players
Tokushima Vortis players
AC Nagano Parceiro players
Ryo Matsumura
Ryo Matsumura
Ryo Matsumura
Ryo Matsumura
Persis Solo players
Japanese expatriate footballers
Expatriate footballers in Thailand
Expatriate footballers in Indonesia
Japanese expatriate sportspeople in Thailand
Japanese expatriate sportspeople in Indonesia
Association football midfielders